Rebellious Soul is the debut studio album by American singer-songwriter K. Michelle. The album was released on August 13, 2013, by Atlantic Records. Its songs were mostly co-written and co-composed by Michelle and Bianca Atterberry. Other artists who collaborated on the album include Tank, Priscilla Renea, Meek Mill, Jack Splash and Barry White. Musically, Rebellious Soul was inspired by Michelle's love for emotional ballads, and the 1970s and 1980s eras in music. She incorporated different combinations of musical genres, including electronic, R&B, hip hop, soul and gospel, for the album's songs.

Upon its release, the album debuted at number two on the Billboard 200, and peaked at number one on the Top R&B/Hip-Hop Albums, selling 72,000 copies in its first week. Rebellious Soul produced two singles, "V.S.O.P.", released on May 20, 2013, and “Can't Raise a Man” was released on January 13, 2014. Michelle promoted Rebellious Soul through an album release party, televised live performances, radio interviews and a concert tour.

The album sold over a million copies worldwide by 2014 and Michelle won the Soul Train Music Award for Best New Artist at the 2013 Soul Train Music Awards. Michelle embarked on the album's first supporting concert tour, Rebellious Soul Tour, in November 2013. Reviews of Rebellious Soul were generally positive, with critics applauding Michelle's personal themes.

Background
In 2008, K. Michelle signed a recording contract with Jive Records. She was working on her debut album titled Pain Medicine. Featured on the album were Trina, Gucci Mane, Akon, Usher, and R. Kelly. Michelle parted ways with RCA in 2011 after initially signing with Jive. "I wanted to get out of my label contract because of things that I couldn't control that happened to me. I did not get dropped. They didn't understand me, and a part of me thinks that I didn't understand myself," K. Michelle says. In 2012, K. Michelle began appearing as one of the main cast members on the VH1 reality television series Love & Hip Hop: Atlanta. Because of the publicity given to her from starring on Love & Hip Hop: Atlanta, she signed a recording contract to Atlantic Records and began working on her debut studio album.

Michelle later announced that the title of her debut album was Rebellious Soul in January 2013. On April 23, 2013, "I Just Wanna" was released as her official buzz single for the promotion of the album. On July 15, 2013, Michelle revealed the album cover artwork for Rebellious Soul. Which she posed with her famous red hair, black dress that showed her curves, while standing in a room with rose petals and lit candles. The cover gives you a since of seduction in an elegant way. About the title of the album Michelle explained, "I decided to name my album ‘Rebellious Soul’ because it's basically me. I'm always in trouble for my beliefs and I'm not a very scary person. If I believe it, I say it. If I feel it, I do it. And I don't really care who's there to judge because I'm being me."

Singles
"V.S.O.P." was released as the album's lead single on May 20, 2013. The song was produced by Pop & Oak, and contains a sample of "Very Special" performed by Debra Laws, as well as "That's How Long" performed by The Chi-Lites. "V.S.O.P." reached at number 89 on the US Hot 100 Singles and number 27 on the Billboard Hot R&B/Hip-Hop Songs charts. The music video (directed by Benny Boom) was released on June 29, 2013.

The album's second single, Can't Raise a Man, was officially released on November 16, 2012, and was later reissued on January 13, 2014, for the album. The song peaked at number 23 on the Hot R&B/Hip-Hop Songs and number 94 on the US Hot 100 Singles charts. The music video (directed by Benny Boom) was released on February 8, 2014.

Critical response 

Rebellious Soul has received mostly positive reviews from critics. At Metacritic, which assigns a normalized rating out of 100 to reviews from mainstream critics, the album received an average score of 71, which indicates "generally favorable reviews", based on 5 reviews. Andy Kellman of Allmusic praised the material influenced by classic soul, citing "Damn" and lead single "V.S.O.P." as key examples, overall referring to it as a "compact, lyrically diverse debut." Stacy-Ann Ellis of Vibe notes Michelle's "rough around the edges" demeanor as evidenced in her role in Love & Hip Hop: Atlanta, but points out that the album shows more to her than just the " 'shaking the table' moments, Piscean dramatics and a mouthful of expletives. Her keep-it-real charm drew fans in, and her rebellious soul will keep them there."

Maura Johnston of MSN Music wrote, "Reality TV junkies might know this fiery singer from VH1′s ‘Love and Hip-Hop Atlanta,’ but she's been releasing real-talk-filled mixtapes for the past three years ... She shows off her super-raunchy, defiantly strong and maternally devoted sides, among others. All of these lyrics sound like they were written in moments of high passion, thanks in part to her take-no-prisoners voice."

Ayara Pommells of Soul Train said, "Overall Rebellious Soul is a great effort from K.Michelle. You can expect to be serenaded with tales of heartbreak, sexual encounters for grown folks and mantras of female empowerment. The production is complementary to both K.Michelle’s heavy vocals and candid lyrical content. She does not drown in the instrumentals. The beats are relatively simple without ever crossing over into vanilla territory. Every detail on this album has been carefully constructed so as to allow K.Michelle to shine her brightest."

Elias Legit of PopMatters was more critical, promptly reminiscing of 2009 buzz single "Fakin' It" as a sign of her manipulation over men and pumping up their egos, while lamenting that the same power was nowhere to be found on Rebellious Soul. Jon Caramancia of The New York Times praised Michelle's "tremendous promise", but was critical of her foul language and lack of boundaries in regards to subject matter, stating, "What she’s missing is restraint."

Commercial performance
Rebellious Soul debuted at number two on the US Billboard 200 and number one on the Top R&B/Hip-Hop Albums charts with 72,000 units album sales.

Promotion
To promote the Rebellious Soul album, K. Michelle embarked on her very first headlining tour, The Rebellious Soul Tour presented by BET Music Matters. The 19 city tour kicked off on November 4, 2013, in San Francisco and ended on December 3, 2013, in Boston. It included stops in Los Angeles, Houston, Chicago, and Atlanta. Opening acts featured Chris Brown protégé Sevyn Streeter and Tiara Thomas.

On December 20, 2013, on BET’s 106 & Park, K. Michelle announced that she would be joining Robin Thicke on the North American leg of his Blurred Lines Tour, kicking off on February 21, 2014, in Atlanta, Georgia.

Track listing

Notes
 signifies an additional producer
 signifies a co-producer

Sampling credits
"V.S.O.P." samples elements of "Very Special", written by Lisa Peters and William Jeffrey, and That's How Long, written by Walter Boyd and Elijah Powell.
"Pay My Bills" samples elements of "Night Moves", written by Frank McDonald and Chris Rae.
"Sometimes" samples elements of "Sometimes", written by Phillip Guilbeau.
"Ride Out" samples elements of "Somebody Is Gonna Off the Man", written by Barry White.
"Better Than Nothing" samples elements of "Goa Dreams", written by Karsh Kale, Gaurav Reina and Wayne Sharpe.

Charts

Weekly charts

Year-end charts

References

2013 debut albums
K. Michelle albums
Atlantic Records albums
Albums produced by Troy Taylor (record producer)
Albums produced by Happy Perez
Albums produced by Needlz
Albums produced by Jack Splash
Albums produced by Oak Felder